The Central District of Namin County is in Ardabil province, Iran. At the 2006 census, its population was 24,709 in 6,138 households. The following census in 2011 counted 26,468 people in 7,621 households. At the latest census in 2016, the district had 25,910 inhabitants living in 7,795 households.

References 

Namin County

Districts of Ardabil Province

Populated places in Ardabil Province

Populated places in Namin County